This list of landslides is a list of notable landslides and mudflows divided into sections by date and type. This list is very incomplete as there is no central catalogue for landslides, although some for individual countries/areas do exist. Volumes of landslides are recorded in the scientific literature using cubic kilometres (km3) for the largest and millions of cubic metres (normally given the non-standard shortening of MCM) for most events.

Prehistoric landslides
Note: km3 = cubic kilometre(s)

Submarine landslides
Note: MCM = million cubic metres; km3 = cubic kilometre(s)

Pre-20th-century historic landslides
Note: km3 = cubic kilometre(s); MCM = million cubic metres

20th-century landslides

1901–1950
Note: km3 = cubic kilometre(s); MCM = million cubic metres

1951–1975
Note: km3 = cubic kilometre(s); MCM = million cubic metres

1976–2000
Note: MCM = million cubic metres

21st-century landslides

2001–2010
Note: m3 = cubic metre(s); MCM = million cubic metres

2011–present
Note: MCM = million cubic metres

Ongoing landslides
Note: MCM = million cubic metres

See also 
 List of avalanches by death toll

References

External links
 United States Geological Survey site

Landslides